The Hovey-Winn House is a historic house at 384 Main Street in Winchester, Massachusetts.  The -story Greek Revival cottage was built c. 1841 by John Coats, a local housewright who built a number of houses along Main Street.  It is one of a small number of local houses (the nearby Horace Hatch House is another) with a side gable roof that overhangs a full-width Doric porch.  The house in the 19th century had a number of locally prominent individuals, include Reverend William Eustis, druggist Josiah Hovey, and Hovey's son-in-law Denis Winn, who owned the town's first livery stable.

The house was listed on the National Register of Historic Places in 1989.

See also
National Register of Historic Places listings in Winchester, Massachusetts

References

Houses on the National Register of Historic Places in Winchester, Massachusetts
Houses in Winchester, Massachusetts